Camoël is a commune in the Morbihan department of Brittany  in north-western France.

Demographics
Inhabitants of Camoël are called in French Camoëlais.

Geography

Historically it belongs to Lower Brittany. Until the 18th century, the spoken language was the breton. Most hamlets have breton names.

Map

See also
La Baule - Guérande Peninsula
Communes of the Morbihan department

References

External links
 Mayors of Morbihan Association 

Communes of Morbihan